Troitsa-Bereg is a rural locality (a selo) in Seletskoye Rural Settlement, Suzdalsky District, Vladimir Oblast, Russia. The population was 123 as of 2010. There are 7 streets.

Geography 
Troitsa-Bereg is located on the Nerl River, 6 km northeast of Suzdal (the district's administrative centre) by road. Suzdal is the nearest rural locality.

References 

Rural localities in Suzdalsky District